Mehdiabad-e Taqi (also Romanized as Mehdīābād-e Ţāqī; also known as Mahdīābād-e Ţāghī) is a village in Golestan Rural District, in the Central District of Sirjan County, Kerman Province, Iran. At the 2006 census, its population was 52, in 11 families.

References 

Populated places in Sirjan County